Trevor Donovan Neubauer (born October 11, 1978), known professionally as Trevor Donovan, is an American actor and model. He is best known for his role as Teddy Montgomery on the hit teen drama television series 90210.

Life and career
Donovan was born in Bishop, California, and raised in Mammoth Lakes, California. He had short stints in 2007 on the NBC daytime soap Days of Our Lives as Jeremy Horton. He had a minor role in the 2009 sci-fi film Surrogates, that of the Surrogate form of Tom Greer (Bruce Willis).

In June 2009, Donovan landed a recurring role on 90210 as Teddy Montgomery, first appearing on September 8, 2009. On May 20, 2010, The CW announced that he was upgraded to series regular. It was later reported that his character would come out as gay in the third season, which premiered on September 13, 2010.

In July 2011, it was reported that Donovan had been signed for a role in Oliver Stone's film Savages, released in July 2012. He had originally screen-tested for a character who was edited out, but after seeing Donovan's screen-test video recording, Stone wrote a part for him that was not in the original book. After 90210 ended, Donovan landed a recurring role in the third season of Melissa & Joey, a situation comedy that starred Melissa Joan Hart and Joey Lawrence as the title characters.

On September 8, 2022, Donovan was announced as a contestant on season 31 of Dancing with the Stars. He is partnered with Emma Slater.

Filmography

References

External links
 

21st-century American male actors
American male film actors
Male models from California
American male soap opera actors
American male television actors
Living people
Male actors from California
People from Bishop, California
People from Mammoth Lakes, California
1980 births